The McClurg Building is a historic skyscraper in the Loop community area of Chicago, Illinois. The building was built in 1899 and designed by  Chicago school architects Holabird & Roche. The building's Wabash Street facade has  of windows bordered by terra cotta piers and spandrels; the amount of window space was necessitated by the absence of windows on the sides of the building. The A.C. McClurg publishing company was the building's main occupant and gave the building its name.

The McClurg Building was added to the National Register of Historic Places on August 17, 1970.

Tenants 
 Exchequer Restaurant and Pub occupies a portion of the first floor, though its street address is 226 South Wabash, the neighboring building.
 Roosevelt University's Dance Studios are located on the third floor.
 Chicago Youth Centers, a non-profit focusing on urban youth, is headquartered on the sixth floor.
 UNITE HERE's Local 1 and national health benefits offices are on the building's seventh and eighth floors, respectively.
 IA Collaborative, a design and innovation consulting firm, occupies the ninth floor and tenth floor penthouse.

References

Commercial buildings on the National Register of Historic Places in Chicago
Chicago school architecture in Illinois
Commercial buildings completed in 1899
Skyscraper office buildings in Chicago
1899 establishments in Illinois